Thomas George Harman (born May 30, 1941) is an American politician. He is a former Republican member of the California State Senate who had previously been a three-term member of the California State Assembly. Both seats represent portions of Orange County.  From January 5 – November 30, 2012, he served as Senate Republican Caucus Chair, the second-ranking leadership position among Senate Republicans.

Education and military service

Harman earned a Bachelor of Science in Business Administration from Kansas State University in 1963. Upon graduating, Harman joined the United States Army and became a lieutenant in the 4th Infantry Division. After completing his tour of duty, he entered Loyola Law School in Los Angeles, finishing near the top of his class and earning his J.D. in 1968.

Legal career

Upon graduating from Loyola, Harman joined the Long Beach law firm of Lucas & Deukmejian, whose partners were future California Chief Justice Malcolm M. Lucas and future Governor George Deukmejian.

Harman and his wife, Dianne, moved to Huntington Beach in the 1970s to start a family. After the birth of his children, Michael and Michelle, Harman wanted to spend more time with his family, so he left Lucas & Deukmejian and started his own law firm, which he remained with for 27 years.

Political career

In 1995, Harman was appointed to fill a vacancy on the Huntington Beach City Council. City residents elected Harman to a full term in 1996. At the conclusion of his term, Harman was elected to the State Assembly with 62% of the vote in 2000 to represent the 67th District. He was re-elected with 69% of the vote in 2002 and 64% of the vote in 2004. He was ineligible to seek a fourth term, due to term limits.

Senate special election
Harman won a hotly contested primary election for the 35th district Senate seat in a special election held in April, 2006 to replace Senator John Campbell who had recently been elected to Congress, thereby creating a vacancy for that Senate seat.  Harman's conservative opponent, Dana Point City Councilwoman Diane Harkey, spent $1.2 million of her own money in an attempt to defeat him.  Harman won the election by a margin of only 256 votes, thereby earning the nickname "Landslide Harman."

In June 2006, Harman won 67.8% of the general election vote to be elected to the State Senate to fill the 35th District seat, vacated when John Campbell became a member of the United States House of Representatives.

Senate tenure

Harman was re-elected to the 35th Senate district in November 2008.  Senator Harman currently holds the position of Republican Caucus Whip. This is the third highest position in the Republican Caucus. In this capacity he is chiefly responsible for ensuring the enforcement of proper procedures and rules on the floor of the Senate.  In addition to his leadership position, he also serves as Vice Chair to both the Senate Judiciary Committee and Senate Governmental Organization Committee.

A recent Sacramento Bee article concluded that Tom Harman had missed or abstained from the highest number of votes of any Senator who wasn't ill, during the 2010 legislative year.

Bid for Attorney General

Harman announced his candidacy for California Attorney General in June 2009.  On June 8, 2010, Harman lost the Republican primary to Los Angeles County District Attorney Steve Cooley, who narrowly lost to Democratic candidate Kamala Harris for the general election.

References

External links
Join California Tom Harman

1941 births
Living people
American Protestants
California city council members
California lawyers
Republican Party California state senators
Kansas State University alumni
Loyola Law School alumni
Republican Party members of the California State Assembly
People from Huntington Beach, California
People from Pasadena, California
United States Army officers
21st-century American politicians
Military personnel from California